The 1940 Tipperary Senior Hurling Championship was the 50th staging of the Tipperary Senior Hurling Championship since its establishment by the Tipperary County Board in 1887.

Thurles Sarsfields were the defending champions.

Moycarkey-Borris won the championship after a 4-07 to 4-02 defeat of Cashel King Cormacs in the final. It was their 10th championship title overall and their first title since 1937.

References

Tipperary
Tipperary Senior Hurling Championship